Akdeğirmen can refer to the following villages in Turkey:

 Akdeğirmen, Sinanpaşa
 Akdeğirmen, Taşköprü

See also
 Akdeğirmen Dam